William Duncan (1717 in Aberdeen – 1760 in Aberdeen) was a Scottish natural philosopher and classicist, professor of natural philosophy at Marischal College, Aberdeen.

Educated at Marischal College, Aberdeen, he was appointed professor of natural philosophy there in 1752. His popular Elements of Logic, first published in Robert Dodsley's The Preceptor (2 vols, London, 1748), combined a Lockean theory of knowledge with syllogistic logic. He translated the Commentaries of Julius Caesar and orations of Cicero; at his death, translations of Plutarch's Lives and a continuation of Thomas Blackwell's Court of Augustus were left unfinished.

Works
 .
 .
 .

Duncan is also sometimes miscredited with The Elements of Moral Philosophy written by David Fordyce.

References

External links

1717 births
1760 deaths
Alumni of the University of Aberdeen
People from Aberdeen
Scottish philosophers
Scottish logicians